In computer science, manifest typing is explicit identification by the software programmer of the type of each variable being declared. For example: if variable X is going to store integers then its type must be declared as integer. The term "manifest typing" is often used with the term latent typing to describe the difference between the static, compile-time type membership of the object and its run-time type identity.

In contrast, some programming languages use implicit typing (a.k.a. type inference) where the type is deduced from context at compile-time or allow for dynamic typing in which the variable is just declared and may be assigned a value of any type at runtime.

Examples
Consider the following example written in the C programming language:
#include <stdio.h>

int main(void) {
    char s[] = "Test String";
    float x = 0.0;
    int y = 0;

    printf("Hello, World!\n");
    return 0;
}
Note that the variables s, x, and y were declared as a character array, floating point number, and an integer, respectively. The type system rejects, at compile-time, such fallacies as trying to add s and x.

In contrast, in Standard ML, the types do not need to be explicitly declared. Instead, the type is determined by the type of the assigned expression.
let val s = "Test String"
    val x = 0.0
    val y = 0
in print "Hello, World!\n"
end
There are no manifest types in this program, but the compiler still infers the types string, real and int for them, and would reject the expression s+x as a compile-time error.

External links
 Manifest typing

Type systems